Cypress Township is a township in Harrison County, in the U.S. state of Missouri.

Cypress Township was established in the 1840s, and most likely was so named on account of the cypress trees within its borders.

References

Townships in Missouri
Townships in Harrison County, Missouri